The United States Senate election of 1952 in New Jersey was held on November 4, 1952. 

Incumbent Republican Senator H. Alexander Smith was re-elected to a second term against Undersecretary of the Army Archibald S. Alexander. Both men were residents of Princeton.

As of 2022, this is the last time the Republicans won the Class 1 Senate seat in New Jersey.

Republican primary

Candidates

Declared
Carl E. Ring, candidate for U.S. Representative in 1950
H. Alexander Smith, incumbent Senator

Results

Democratic primary

Candidates
Archibald S. Alexander, United States Under Secretary of the Army and nominee for U.S. Senate in 1948

Results

General election

Candidates
Archibald S. Alexander (Democrat), United States Under Secretary of the Army and nominee for U.S. Senate in 1948
George Breitman (Socialist Workers), activist and editor of The Militant
Albert Ronis (Socialist Labor)
H. Alexander Smith (Republican), incumbent Senator
A. N. Smith (Prohibition)
Katharine A. Van Orden (Progressive)

Results

See also 
1952 United States Senate elections

References

New Jersey
1952
1952 New Jersey elections